Pennsylvania Route 33 (PA 33) is a   limited-access state highway in eastern Pennsylvania. The highway runs from its interchange with Interstate 78 (I-78) south of Easton in the Lehigh Valley to I-80 and PA 611 west of Stroudsburg. 

Until 2002, the route's southern terminus was at U.S. Route 22 (US 22), and the extension south of the US 22 interchange is known as the Gen. Anthony Clement McAuliffe Memorial Highway (named in honor of American World War II general Anthony McAuliffe). The route is commonly used as a hazmat bypass for the Pennsylvania Turnpike's Northeast Extension due to the restrictions in place on the Lehigh Tunnel. PA 33 provides a freeway connection between the Lehigh Valley and Pocono Mountains regions of Pennsylvania.

Route description

PA 33 begins at a trumpet interchange with I-78 in Lower Saucon Township in Northampton County, which is in the Lehigh Valley. From this interchange, the route heads northwest as a four-lane freeway onto the Gene Hartzell Memorial Bridge, passing over Norfolk Southern's Lehigh Line and the Lehigh River, where the highway briefly cuts through the southwestern tip of the city of Easton before crossing the Lehigh Canal into Bethlehem Township. Past the bridge, the freeway passes farm fields before it comes to a partial cloverleaf interchange with Freemansburg Avenue in a business area adjacent to St. Luke's Hospital–Anderson Campus. Following this, PA 33 curves north near commercial development and reaches a diamond interchange with William Penn Highway, with a park and ride lot located at the northwest quadrant of this interchange. The route heads near a mix of residential development and farmland, curving northeast before turning north and coming to a cloverleaf interchange with the US 22 freeway. After the US 22 interchange, the freeway crosses into Lower Nazareth Township and reaches a partial cloverleaf interchange with Hecktown Road. PA 33 continues north past farm fields and curves northeast as it comes to a partial cloverleaf interchange with PA 248 in a business area.

Past this interchange, the route enters Palmer Township and runs through a mix of farm fields and industrial development, coming to a diamond interchange with Main Street that serves the borough of Tatamy to the east. The freeway curves north and crosses Bushkill Creek into the borough of Stockertown, where it passes over Norfolk Southern's Cement Secondary line and a railroad spur and turns northwest to reach a diamond interchange with PA 191. PA 33 continues past industrial areas and leaves Stockertown for Plainfield Township, passing over a Norfolk Southern railroad spur. The route heads into wooded areas and crosses into Bushkill Township, where it reaches a diamond interchange with Henry Road that serves the community of Belfast to the east. A park and ride lot is located within the southeast quadrant of this interchange. Past this interchange, the freeway heads east of the Jacobsburg Environmental Education Center as it continues through woodland with some farm fields and residential development. PA 33 turns north and crosses back into Plainfield Township, where it comes to a partial cloverleaf interchange with PA 512 in an area of businesses that serves the borough of Wind Gap. Past this interchange, the freeway passes through a corner of Wind Gap before it continues back into Plainfield Township and heads into forested areas, heading through a gap in the Blue Mountain ridge. The route turns northeast and comes to a southbound exit and northbound entrance with Broadway that provides access Wind Gap. At this interchange, the freeway passes over the Appalachian Trail.

At the interchange with Broadway, PA 33 crosses into Hamilton Township in Monroe County, which is in the Pocono Mountains region of the state, and continues through forested areas, turning northwest and entering Ross Township. The freeway curves north and then northeast, crossing back into Hamilton Township and turning northwest. The route reaches the community of Saylorsburg, where a southbound exit and entrance connects to Wilkes Barre Turnpike and a northbound exit and entrance connects to Cherry Valley Road. From here, PA 33 turns northeast and runs through wooded areas with some fields and homes, soon making a curve to the north. The freeway comes to a trumpet interchange with US 209, at which point US 209 joins PA 33 in a concurrency on the freeway. The two routes continue north-northeast through woodland with some development, crossing McMichael Creek and coming to a diamond interchange with Manor Drive that serves the community of Snydersville. From here, the freeway passes west of Monroe County Correctional Facility and crosses Appenzell Creek before PA 33 exits from the US 209 freeway at a northbound exit and southbound entrance, with signs leading travelers to eastbound and from westbound I-80 via US 209. After this, PA 33 reaches a southbound exit and northbound entrance with US 209 Bus. that serves Snydersville. The route continues northeast through wooded areas, passing to the northwest of Snydersville Raceway before turning north. The freeway heads through forested areas with some homes, curving to the north-northeast and crossing Pocono Creek. The route comes to a partial interchange with I-80, with no access from northbound PA 33 to eastbound I-80 or from westbound I-80 to southbound PA 33, the missing movements having been provided by US 209 at the freeway split. Past this, PA 33 crosses into Stroud Township and reaches its northern terminus at an at-grade intersection with PA 611 in a business area.

History

The construction of PA 33 started in 1959, and stretched from the PA 512 interchange to Saylorsburg. Construction finished in 1960. The stretch connecting the highway to I-80 was built and completed by 1964. Construction on PA 33 was not continued until 1969 when work began on the stretch from PA 512 in Wind Gap to Henry Road in Belfast. This stretch was completed by 1970. By 1972, the road had reached what is now PA 191 in Stockertown, and was extended down to its long-term southern terminus at US 22. The highway was left at that until 1999 when construction began on a final segment that would connect the US 22 interchange to I-78. The final three-mile (5 km) stretch opened in January 2002.

In January 2004, the expressway was shut down between Lower Nazareth Township (PA 248) and Stockertown (PA 191) because of a sinkhole that was in the area of the Bushkill Creek directly under a northbound bridge support beam. Crossovers were created, narrowing the highway to one lane in each direction through Stockertown. Studies were conducted, and came to the conclusion that the bridge was dangerous and could not be fixed. The northbound bridge was demolished in February of the same year. Just 21 days later, a sinkhole was discovered under the southbound bridge over the Bushkill Creek, and resulted in the demolition of the southbound bridge. Once the new northbound bridge was completed, another crossover was created, detouring southbound traffic onto the northbound side of the highway. On April 21, 2004, a depression formed under the new northbound bridge, and the highway was shut down once again to fill the area with bituminous material. The bridge re-opened within twenty minutes. By November 19, 2004, both bridges were completed and opened. All of this happened feet from the Bushkill Street Bridge connecting Stockertown and Palmer Township, which has been closed since 1999 because of numerous sinkholes causing the bridge to collapse.

On March 21, 2009, a tractor-trailer carrying 32,000 pounds of hydrofluoric acid overturned on southbound PA 33 in Plainfield Township, prompting the evacuation of about 5,000 people. The truck, registered to the Honeywell company, flipped over at about 2:40 a.m. after the driver swerved to avoid a deer. Nobody was injured and the highway was reopened later that day. Hundreds of evacuees were taken to the Pen Argyl Area High School in nearby Pen Argyl.

On January 31, 2013, ground was broken for a new interchange at Main Street in Palmer Township to the west of Tatamy, with Governor Tom Corbett in attendance. This interchange is being constructed to serve the Palmer Industrial Park and is expected to bring economic development to the area. Completion of this interchange, which is to cost $40 million, was originally planned for November 2014. However, work on the project was halted during the winter of 2014-2015, with completion pushed back to June 2015.

Exit list

See also

References

External links

Pennsylvania Highways: PA 33
Pennsylvania Roads - PA 33
The Roads of Metro Philadelphia: PA 33 Expressway

033
Limited-access roads in Pennsylvania
Transportation in Northampton County, Pennsylvania
Transportation in Monroe County, Pennsylvania